The Gay Adventure is a 1931 comedy play by the British-American writer Walter C. Hackett.

It ran for 291 performances at the Whitehall Theatre in the West End between 23 December 1931 and 3 September 1932. The original cast included Seymour Hicks, Charles Quatermaine, Eric Maturin, Nora Swinburne and Marion Lorne.

Adaptation
In 1936 it was made into a film of the same title directed by Sinclair Hill and starring Yvonne Arnaud.

References

Bibliography
 Goble, Alan. The Complete Index to Literary Sources in Film. Walter de Gruyter, 1999.
 Wearing, J.P. The London Stage 1930-1939: A Calendar of Productions, Performers, and Personnel.  Rowman & Littlefield, 2014.

1931 plays
British plays adapted into films
West End plays
Comedy plays
Plays by Walter C. Hackett